Tomasz Chrzanowski (born 4 February 1980 in Lulkowo, Toruń County, Poland) is a former motorcycle speedway rider from Poland.

Career
Chrzanowski has represented the Poland national speedway team.

Speedway Grand Prix results

Career details

World Championships 
 Individual World Championship (Speedway Grand Prix)
 2004 - 39th place (2 point as wild card)
 2005 - 15th place (28 point)
 Individual U-21 World Championship
 1998 - 9th place (7 points)
 1999 - 13th place (5 points)
 2001 - 15th place (4 points)

European Championships 
 European Under-19 Championship
 1998 - 12th place (4 points)
 1999 - 4th place (12+2 points)
 European Speedway Club Champions' Cup
 2002 - Bronze medal (4 points)

Domestic competitions 
 Individual Polish Championship
 2003 - finalist
 2004 - finalist
 Individual U-21 Polish Championship
 1999 - Bronze medal
 2000 - Silver medal
 Polish Pairs Championship
 2004 - Bronze medal
 Polish Under-21 Pairs Championship
 2000 - Bronze medal
 Team Polish Championship (Speedway Ekstraliga)
 2001 - Polish Champion  with Apator Toruń
 Team U-21 Polish Championship
 1999 - Bronze medal

See also 

 Polish national speedway team
 List of Speedway Grand Prix riders

References

1980 births
Living people
Polish speedway riders
Polonia Bydgoszcz riders
Poole Pirates riders
Swindon Robins riders
People from Toruń County